The Grand Capucin (3,838 m) is a rock pinnacle located underneath Mont Blanc du Tacul in the Mont Blanc Massif in Haute-Savoie, France.

Climbing 
The Grand Capucin is famous for its amazing climbing, but only at harder levels or with Aid.

Alpine three-thousanders
Mountains of Haute-Savoie
Mountains of the Alps